Carter(s), or Carter's, Tha Carter, or The Carter(s), may refer to:

Geography

United States
 Carter, Arkansas, an unincorporated community
 Carter, Mississippi, an unincorporated community
 Carter, Montana, a census-designated place
 Carter, Oklahoma, a town
 Carter, South Dakota, an unincorporated community
 Carter, Texas, a census-designated place
 Carter, Forest County, Wisconsin, an unincorporated community
 Carter, Iron County, Wisconsin, an unincorporated community
 Carter, Wyoming, a census-designated place
 Carters, Georgia, an unincorporated community
 Carter County (disambiguation)

Elsewhere
 Carter Islands, in Nunavut, Canada
 Carter Road Promenade, former name of Sangeet Samrat Naushad Ali Marg in Mubai, India

People and fictional characters
 Carter (name), a surname and a given name, including a list of people and fictional characters
 Carter, someone whose occupation is transporting goods by cart or wagon

Arts and entertainment

Music

Groups
 Carter the Unstoppable Sex Machine, an English indie punk band also known as Carter USM
 The Carters, the American duo behind the album Everything Is Love (2018)

Albums
 Tha Carter, a Lil Wayne album
 Tha Carter II, a Lil Wayne album
 Tha Carter III, a Lil Wayne album
 Tha Carter IV, a Lil Wayne album
  Tha Carter V, a Lil Wayne album

Film and television
 Carter, a character in the 1986 American science fiction movie Howard the Duck
 Carter (TV series), a 2018 Canadian television crime drama
 The Carter, a 2019 American documentary film about Dwayne Carter
 Carter (film), a 2022 South Korean action adventure film

Brands and enterprises
 Carter Machinery, a Virginia-based Caterpillar distributor and manufacturer of engine lubricants
 Carter's, a clothing manufacturer of primarily baby and children's apparel
 Carter's Foods, a defunct supermarket chain
 Carters Coach Services, a bus operating company in Suffolk, England

Other uses
 Carter (supercomputer), an installation at Purdue University

See also
 Agent Carter (disambiguation)